Gallatin High School may refer to the following schools in the United States:

 Gallatin High School (Illinois) in Junction, Illinois
 Gallatin County High School (Kentucky) in Warsaw, Kentucky
 Gallatin County High School (Montana) in Bozeman, Montana
 Gallatin High School (Tennessee) in Gallatin, Tennessee

See also
 Gallatin College (disambiguation)
 Gallatin School (Uniontown, Pennsylvania)